Lingual branch can refer to:

 Lingual branches of glossopharyngeal nerve
 Lingual branches of hypoglossal nerve